The "Moscow trials of 1938" may refer to:

 The Moscow Trials series of show trials, some of which occurred in 1938.
 The Trial of the Twenty-One, one of the Moscow Trials, in 1938 specifically.